Rachel Nichols may refer to:
Rachel Nichols (journalist) (born 1973), American sports broadcaster
Rachel Nichols (actress) (born 1980), American actress

See also
Rachel Nicholls, English soprano
Rachel Nicol (disambiguation)
Rachel Nickell, English murder victim